The 2018 Maine House of Representatives elections took place as part of the biennial United States elections. Maine voters elected state representatives in all 151 of the state house's districts, as well as non-voting members from the Passamaquoddy Tribe and the Houlton Band of Maliseet Indians. State representatives serve two-year terms in the Maine State House.

A primary election on June 12, 2018 determined which candidates appear on the November 6 general election ballot. Primary election results can be obtained from the Maine Secretary of State's website.

Following the 2016 state house elections, Democrats maintained effective control of the House with 77 members and 2 coalition Green representatives. Republicans held 72 seats following the 2016 elections. Following several vacancies and replacements between 2016 and 2018, on election day 2018, the Democrats had increased their majority to 74 Democrats, 1 Green, and 6 Independent representatives, while the Republicans had decreased from 72 to 70 seats.

The Maine Secretary of State provides both a detailed description of each house seat as well as maps for each district, including this statewide House map showing all 151 House districts.

The Democrats gained sixteen seats in the election, and the Republicans lost thirteen. The sole Green member — Ralph Chapman — was replaced by a Democrat, and the number of independents was reduced from six to five, with only two independent incumbents — Kent Ackley and Norman Higgins — being re-elected.

Summary of Results by State House District
Italics denote an open seat held by the incumbent party, bold text denotes a gain for a party. 

Source:

Term-limited incumbents
21 incumbents (5 Democrats, 14 Republicans, one Independent and one Green) were ineligible to run for a 5th consecutive term due to term limits.

Wayne Parry (R), District 10
Heather Sirocki (R), District 28
Kimberly Monaghan (D), District 30
Denise Harlow (I), District 36
Stephen Wood (R), District 57
Eleanor Espling (R), District 65
Tom Winsor (R), District 71
Jeffrey Timberlake (R), District 75
Deborah Sanderson (R), District 88
Erin Herbig (D), District 97
James Gillway (R), District 98
Kenneth Fredette (R), District 100
Stacey Guerin (R), District 102
Raymond Wallace (R), District 104
Thomas Longstaff (D), District 109
Russell Black (R), District 114
Louis Luchini (D), District 132
Ralph Chapman (G), District 133
Walter Kumiega (D), District 134
Richard Malaby (R), District 136
Beth Turner (R), District 141

Detailed Results by State House District

Sources:

District 1

District 2

District 3

District 4

District 5

District 6

District 7

District 8

District 9

District 10

District 11

District 12

District 13

District 14

District 15

District 16

District 17

District 18

District 19

District 20

District 21

District 22

District 23

District 24

District 25

District 26

District 27

District 28

District 29

District 30

District 31

District 32

District 33

District 34

District 35

District 36

District 37

District 38

District 39

District 40

District 41

District 42

District 43

District 44

District 45

District 46

District 47

District 48

District 49

District 50

District 51

District 52

District 53

District 54

District 55

District 56

District 57

District 58

District 59

District 60

District 61

District 62

District 63

District 64

District 65

District 66

District 67

District 68

District 69

District 70

District 71

District 72

District 73

District 74

District 75

District 76

District 77

District 78

District 79

District 80

District 81

District 82

District 83

District 84

District 85

District 86

District 87

District 88

District 89

District 90

District 91

District 92

District 93

District 94

District 95

District 96

District 97

District 98

District 99

District 100

District 101

District 102

District 103

District 104

District 105

District 106

District 107

District 108

District 109

District 110

District 111

District 112

District 113

District 114

District 115

District 116

District 117

District 118

District 119

District 120

District 121

District 122

District 123

District 124

District 125

District 126

District 127

District 128

District 129

District 130

District 131

District 132

District 133

District 134

District 135

District 136

District 137

District 138

District 139

District 140

District 141

District 142

District 143

District 144

District 145

District 146

District 147

District 148

District 149

District 150

District 151

See also
2018 United States elections
2018 United States Senate election in Maine
2018 United States House of Representatives elections in Maine
2018 Maine gubernatorial election
2018 Maine State Senate election
June 2018 Maine Question 1

References

House of Representatives
Maine House of Representatives elections
Maine House of Representatives